The great elaenia (Elaenia dayi) is a species of bird in the family Tyrannidae, the tyrant flycatchers. It is endemic and restricted mostly to the higher altitude plateau-Tepuis of Venezuela and far northern Brazil, and may also occur in Guyana.

Its natural habitats are subtropical or tropical moist montane forests and subtropical or tropical high-altitude shrubland.

Subspecies
Twosubspecies are recognized:
 Elaenia dayi dayi – Chapman, 1929: found in southern Bolívar (Venezuela)
 Elaenia dayi auyantepui – Zimmer & Phelps Sr., 1952: found in south-eastern Bolívar (Venezuela)

References

External links
Great elaenia videos on the Internet Bird Collection
Photo-Medium Res; Article – lachuleta

great elaenia
Birds of the Tepuis
great elaenia
Taxonomy articles created by Polbot